Hamid Reza Ardalan (born 23 September 1959) is an Iranian theorist, author, composer, theater and performing arts researcher, and professor.

Biography
Ardalan began his artistic career with music and theater learning in 1966. In 1985 he began his professional career in the field of puppet theater and music. He attained a PhD in philosophy and etymology, music and theater. He was the head of the UNIMA branch of Iran, holder of UNIMA's global management chair and chair of the union's Heritage Preservation Committee. Since 2016, he is President of UNIMA International's Heritage Commission, and has performed in puppet theater and theaters worldwide. He has published articles and books, and as artistic director has launched national and international events, festivals and seminars, especially in the field of puppet theater. He is the founder of the Alphabets and Puppet Theater group and the Tehran Experimental Orchestra.

Books
Picture-Storyteller Masters of Iran
Proceedings of the Fourth International Seminar on Ritual and Traditional Performances

References

External links 
 
 Hamid Reza Ardalan at Spotify

20th-century Iranian musicians
1959 births
Iranian musicologists
Living people
UNIMA
Ethnomusicologists
Kurdish musicians
People from Sanandaj